Coleophora qulikushella is a moth of the family Coleophoridae. It is found in Iran and Greece.

References

qulikushella
Moths of the Middle East
Moths of Europe
Moths described in 1959